"Mala: I Mousiki Tou Anemou" is a single by Anna Vissi from the original soundtrack of the same name, released in 2002 by Sony Music in Greece and Cyprus.

Release
The single was released as promotion for the full-length soundtrack of the theatrical opera about a love story during the Holocaust where Vissi played the lead of Mala Zimetbaum.

Track listing
"I Mousiki Tou Anemou" (The music of the wind)
"Gia Ena Oneiro Zoume" (We live for a dream)
"O, Erota" (Oh love!)
"I Mousiki Tou Anemou (Instrumental)" (The music of the wind (Instrumental))

Chart performance

External links
 Official site

Anna Vissi songs